The Social Security Act refers to government welfare legislation:
Social Security Act 1991, for Australia.
Social Security Board (Belize), for Belize
Unorganised Workers' Social Security Act 2008, for India
Employees' Social Security Act 1969, for Malaysia
Social Security Act 1938, for New Zealand
Social Security System (Philippines), for the Philippines
Social Security (Scotland) Act 2018, for Scotland
Social security in Spain, for Spain
Social Security Administration Act 1992, for the United Kingdom
Social Security Contributions and Benefits Act 1992, for the United Kingdom
Ministry of Social Security Act 1966, for the United Kingdom
Social Security Act of 1935, for the United States